Charles Horace "Horrie" Farmer (6 October 1888 – 27 April 1934) was an Australian rules footballer who played with St Kilda in the Victorian Football League (VFL).

Farmer came to St Kilda from the local state school and played with them for two seasons. He made one appearance in the 1907 VFL season and another two in the 1908 VFL season.

He spent the rest of his career at Prahran and Warragul.

His brother, Roy Farmer, played for St Kilda as well and his son, also named Horrie, played in the VFL during the 1930s.

References

1888 births
1934 deaths
Australian rules footballers from Bendigo
Prahran Football Club players
St Kilda Football Club players
Warragul Football Club players